Tamalluma is a former Roman city which remains a Latin Catholic titular bishopric

History 
The city was at Telmin, an oasis in present Tunisia, one of many in the Roman province of Byzacena, which were suffragan of the Metropolitan Archbishopric Hadrumetum (Sousse), but faded.

Titular see 
The diocese was nominally restored in 1933 as a titular bishopric, of the (lowest) episcopal) rank, with a single incumbent of Archiepiscopal rank.

Known Bishops
Habetdeus (Catholic bishop mentioned in 484) 
Antonio † (mentioned in 484) (Arian bishop)
 ''Titular Archbishop George Joseph Biskup (1967.07.20 – 1970.01.03) as Coadjutor Archbishop of Indianapolis (USA) (1967.07.20 – 1970.01.03), later succeeding as Metropolitan Archbishop of Indianapolis (1970.01.03 – death 1979.03.20); previously Titular Bishop of Hemeria (1957.03.09 – 1965.01.30) as Auxiliary Bishop of Dubuque (USA) (1957.03.09 – 1965.01.30), then Bishop of Des Moines (USA) (1965.01.30 – 1967.07.20)
 Francis Joseph Walmsley (1979.01.08 – 1998.03.07), last Military Vicar (1979.01.08 – 1986.07.21) and first Military Ordinary (1986.07.21 – 2002.05.24) of the Bishopric of the Forces in Great Britain
 António José Cavaco Carrilho Carrilho (1999.02.22 – 2007.03.08) as Auxiliary Bishop of (O)Porto (Portugal) (1999.02.22 – 2007.03.08); later Bishop of Funchal (Portugal) (2007.03.08 – ...)
 Anton Bal (2007.06.05 – 2009.01.12) as Auxiliary Bishop of Kundiawa (Papua New Guinea) (2007.06.05 – 2009.01.12), later succeeded as Bishop of Kundiawa (2009.01.12 – 2019.07.26) and as Archbishop of Madang (2019.07.26 – ...)
 Samuel Irenios Kattukallil (2010.01.25 – ...), Auxiliary Bishop of Trivandrum of the Syro-Malankars (India, Eastern Catholic of Antiochian Rite)

External links and sources 
 GCatholic

Specific

Catholic titular sees in Africa